Matushkino is a district of Moscow within Zelenogradsky Administrative Okrug.

See also
Administrative divisions of Moscow

References

Notes

Sources

 
Zelenograd
Districts of Moscow